Yang Sheng-Hsiung (born June 1, 1983) is a Taiwanese weightlifter. He represented Chinese Taipei at two Olympic games, and had won a silver medal for the featherweight category (62 kg) at the 2009 East Asian Games in Hong Kong, China.

At the 2004 Summer Olympics in Athens, Yang placed ninth in the men's 62-kg class, by lifting a total of 280 kg. He repeated his position for the same category at the 2008 Summer Olympics in Beijing, with a snatch of 130 kg, and a clean and jerk of 157 kg, to combine a total of 287 kg.

References

External links
NBC 2008 Olympics profile

Taiwanese male weightlifters
1983 births
Living people
Olympic weightlifters of Taiwan
Weightlifters at the 2004 Summer Olympics
Weightlifters at the 2008 Summer Olympics
Weightlifters at the 2006 Asian Games
Weightlifters at the 2010 Asian Games
Asian Games competitors for Chinese Taipei